Akasa Veedhilo is a 2001 Indian Telugu-language drama film written and directed by Singeetam Srinivasa Rao. Produced by Ramoji Rao, the film stars Nagarjuna, Rajendra Prasad, Raveena Tandon and Kasthuri, with music composed by M. M. Keeravani.

Plot 
Chandu (Nagarjuna) and Suri (Rajendra Prasad) are domestic pilots and thick friends. Indu (Raveena Tandon) and Padma (Kasthuri) are very good friends. Chandu marries Indu and Suri marries Padma. Indu and Padma become pregnant. Indu meets with a car accident and she becomes infertile. Padma gives birth to twins, Ram and Lakshman (Master Teja). Indu and Chandu adopt Ram. After three years, Lakshman is diagnosed with Acute Leukemia He needs to undergo bone marrow transplantation. Indu refuses and flees with Ram to Delhi fearing that Chandu will force her to send Ram for operation. Later on, she realizes her mistake and boards a flight to return to her husband so that Ram can be operated upon. Pakistani militants hijack the flight and they divert the flight's route. Whilst Chandu rescues the hijacked flight and Lakshman recuperates from the Cancer.

Cast 

 Nagarjuna Akkineni as Chandu / Chandra Shekar
 Raveena Tandon as Indu
 Rajendra Prasad as Suri Babu
 Kasthuri as Padma
 Rahul Dev as Terrorist
 Kota Srinivasa Rao as G.K.
 Sudhakar as Mohan
 Mallikarjuna Rao as Bhajanlal
 Giri Babu as Jagadiswara Rao
 Chalapathi Rao
 A.V.S
 M. S. Narayana
 Lakshmi Ratan as Prasad Rao
 Kaushal Manda as Terrorist
 Raghunatha Reddy
 Shankar Melkote
 Ironleg Sastry as himself
 Jenny
 Siva Parvathi as G.K's wife
 Sri Lakshmi
 Rajitha as Kamala
 Madhurisen as Air Hostess
 Teja Sajja as Ram and Laksham (dual role)

Production
It was reported by the media that Singeetam lost interest in the project midway and that R. R. Shinde completed the film.

Soundtrack 

Music composed by M. M. Keeravani.

References

External links 

2000s Telugu-language films
2001 drama films
2001 films
Films about aviators
Films directed by Singeetam Srinivasa Rao
Films scored by M. M. Keeravani
Indian aviation films
Indian drama films
Indian films about cancer